Na'aleh or Naale may refer to:

 Na'ale, a communal Israeli settlement in the West Bank
 Camp Na'aleh, a New York summer camp run by Habonim Dror
 Naale (film)
 Naale program, an international high school in Israel program